George Christopoulos (born 11 December 1960) is an Australian former soccer player, who played as a midfielder.

Playing career

Club career
Christopoulos played for South Melbourne, Canberra City, Heidelberg and Adelaide City in the Australian National Soccer League. In 1984 he played one season in Greece with AEK Athens.

International career
He played ten full international matches for Australia, scoring once.

References

1960 births
Living people
Australian soccer players
Australia international soccer players
Association football midfielders
Australian people of Greek descent
1980 Oceania Cup players
AEK Athens F.C. players